Christopher Plys (born August 13, 1987) is an American curler from Duluth, Minnesota. He is a Junior World Champion and two-time National Men's Champion. He was the alternate for the United States men's team at the 2010 Winter Olympics and a member of both the men's team and the mixed doubles team at the 2022 Winter Olympics.

Career
Plys started curling in 1998 at the age of eleven. He competed at seven Junior National Championships in a row, winning five of them, including four in a row as skip to finish his junior career. This gives him more junior national titles as skip than any other junior male. As US Champion, he competed at four World Junior Championships. In his first, 2006, Plys took ninth place in Jeonju, South Korea. The next year, in 2007, he took fifth place in Eveleth, Minnesota. And finally in 2008, Plys won the gold medal in Ostersund, Sweden. At his final Junior Worlds in 2009 he again medaled, taking the bronze. Plys also competed at the World University Games in 2007, in Pinerolo, Italy, playing second on John Shuster's gold medal team.
 
Early in his men's career, Plys was twice invited to be alternate on Shuster's team at international events, at the World Championship in 2009 and the 2010 Winter Olympics. At the Olympics, he was called in to skip the team (in place of Shuster) during draw 6 after the US team suffered four losses in a row, and led the team to a 4–3 victory over France after a 10th end steal. Following the Olympics, Plys was drafted onto Tyler George's team, where he threw third rocks (and sometimes fourth). The George team finished as runners-up in the 2011 and 2013 national championships. In 2014, Plys moved to third on Heath McCormick's team, which placed third in the 2014 and 2015 national championships, and second in both the 2017 Olympic Trials (to Shuster) and 2018 national championships. 

After winning gold at the 2018 Olympics, Tyler George, who had moved to Shuster's team, took a hiatus from curling, and Plys replaced him at third. Team Shuster then won the 2019 national championships and represented the US at the 2019 World Men's Curling Championship, where they finished in fifth place. They defended their United States title at the 2020 United States Men's Championship, defeating Rich Ruohonen in the final to finish the tournament undefeated. The national title would have earned Team Shuster a spot at the final Grand Slam of the season, the Champions Cup, as well as the chance to represent the United States at the 2020 World Men's Curling Championship, but both events were cancelled due to the COVID-19 pandemic.

Team Shuster represented the United States at the 2021 World Men's Curling Championship, which was played in a fan-less bubble in Calgary due to the ongoing COVID-19 pandemic. There, the team led the U.S. to a 10–3 round robin record, in third place. They played Switzerland in the playoffs, in a game which was delayed a day due to some curlers initially testing positive (including Plys himself) for the virus, but later testing negative (it was later revealed that they were all false positives). In the game, Switzerland, skipped by Peter de Cruz, beat the Americans to advance to the semifinals.

Personal life
Plys is self-employed. As of 2021, he is engaged.

Teams

Men's

Mixed doubles

References

External links

 

1987 births
Living people
American male curlers
Olympic curlers of the United States
Curlers at the 2010 Winter Olympics
Sportspeople from Duluth, Minnesota
Medalists at the 2007 Winter Universiade
Continental Cup of Curling participants
Universiade medalists in curling
American curling champions
Universiade gold medalists for the United States
Competitors at the 2007 Winter Universiade
Curlers at the 2022 Winter Olympics